= Khablain Na Mohra =

- Town
- Location within Pakistan
- Coordinates: 33.26°N 73.25°E
- Country: Pakistan
- Province: (Islamabad Capital Territory) Islamabad C.T
- Elevation: 545 m (1,788 ft)
- Time zone: UTC+5 (PST)

Khablain Na Mohra is a town in the Islamabad Capital Territory of Pakistan. It is located at 33° 26' 15N 73° 25' 5E with an altitude of 545 metres (1791 feet).
